Alan Greenberg (October 14, 1950January 27, 2015) was an American film director, screenwriter, photographer, and author.

Greenberg visited Jamaica from a young age, and was a friend of Bob Marley. Following Marley's death, Marley's family asked Greenberg to make a film about Marley.  In 1981, Greenberg filmed Land of Look Behind (1982), a documentary film that includes footage of Marley's funeral as well as scenes filmed in Jamaica's remote Cockpit Country and the capital city of Kingston. The film ended up being more of a visionary portrait of the Jamaica of that period (focusing on the Rastafari movement and reggae culture) than a film primarily about Marley. The film has won considerable critical acclaim, as well as winning the Gold Hugo Award for Best Documentary in the Chicago International Film Festival, the U.S.'s largest film competition. Land of Look Behind has also been honored as the best American documentary film of its era, and the legendary filmmaker Werner Herzog says "'Land of Look Behind' has achieved things never seen before in cinema."

Greenberg worked closely with Werner Herzog on many projects.  He served as a special unit photographer on the films Cape Fear by Martin Scorsese (1991), and 1900 by Bernardo Bertolucci (1976). He also wrote twenty screenplays and three books. His book Heart of Glass, about the making of the 1976 Werner Herzog masterwork of the same name, was called "The best book on the making of a film ever written" by Rolling Stone magazine. A new and entirely revised edition of the book, entitled, "EVERY NIGHT THE TREES DISAPPEAR: Werner Herzog and the Making of 'Heart of Glass'" was published in hard cover by the Chicago Review Press. It featured Greenberg's previously-unpublished photographs, which Herzog called "strange and beautiful."In 2012 Greenberg was going to write and produce a film based on his acclaimed screenplay "Love in Vain", a poetic account of the mysterious blues genius Robert Johnson. "Love in Vain" was also the first screenplay ever published by a major house (Doubleday) as literature.

Greenberg's latest screenplay, "Tutankhamun – Lord of Two Lands", a radically researched vision of the Boy King's murder intertwined with the intrigue surrounding his tomb's discovery in 1922, was to have been produced in 2013.

Films

As director
1982 – Land of Look Behind1988 – Living DreamsBooks
Greenberg, Alan (1976). Heart of Glass. Text and photos by A. Greenberg, scenario by W. Herzog, based on H. Achternbusch's Die Stunde des Todes. Munich: Skellig.
Greenberg, Alan (1994). Love in Vain: A Vision of Robert Johnson. 1st Da Capo Press ed. New foreword by Martin Scorsese; introduction by Stanley Crouch. Screenplay of an unproduced motion picture. New York: Da Capo Press. (Originally published: Garden City, New York: Doubleday, 1983.) .
Greenberg, Alan (1983). Love in Vain: The Life and Legend of Robert Johnson''. 1st ed. A Dolphin book. Garden City, New York: Doubleday. .
Greenberg, Alan (2012). "Every Night the Trees Disappear: Werner Herzog and the Making of 'Heart of Glass'". Chicago: Chicago Review Press.

References

External links

Article from New York Press, 2000

1950 births
2015 deaths
American film directors
American male screenwriters
American documentary filmmakers
Writers from Portland, Oregon
Screenwriters from Oregon